James Burke (born 1999) is an Irish hurler who plays as a left corner-forward for the Kildare senior team.

Burke made his debut on the inter-county scene at the age of sixteen when he was selected for the Kildare minor team as a dual player. He enjoyed two unsuccessful championship seasons in this grade. He made his senior debut with the Kildare senior team during the 2018 league.

Career statistics

References

1999 births
Living people
Naas hurlers
Naas Gaelic footballers
Kildare inter-county hurlers
Kildare inter-county Gaelic footballers